Mostafa Salimi is an Iranian municipal official who was appointed as the acting Mayor of Tehran on 27 August 2017, an office he held only for hours.

He previously served as the mayor of Tehran's districts 6, 21 and 18.

In 2014, he was appointed as a board member of Persepolis F.C. and unsuccessfully ran for a seat in the City Council of Tehran in 2017.

References

Mayors of Tehran
Living people
Mayors of districts in Tehran
Year of birth missing (living people)